Madonna and Child with St John the Baptist and St Catherine of Alexandria or Mystic Marriage of Saint Catherine with St John the Baptist is an oil on panel painting by Andrea Previtali, produced c. 1504, during his youthful years in Giovanni Bellini's studio. Belonging to the sacra conversazione genre, it is now in the sacristy of the church of San Giobbe in Venice, whilst a (probably later) autograph copy of the work is now in the National Gallery in London. The London work includes a scroll below Mary inscribed + 1504/Andrea Cordelle/Agi dissipulus/iouanis Bellini/pinxit and the number 24, variously interpreted as the artist's age or as his personal symbol using the signus tabellanolis, a technique used by 16th century notaries the better to identify works' and documents' authenticity.

References

Paintings by Andrea Previtali
Previtali
Paintings depicting John the Baptist
Paintings in Venice
1504 paintings